Ten Year Old Tom is an American adult animated sitcom created by Steve Dildarian for HBO Max. On July 1, 2022, the series was renewed for a second season.

Premise 
An average kid must contend with the well-meaning but questionable guidance of the adults around him.

Cast

Main
 Steve Dildarian as Tom
 Byron Bowers as Nelson
 Edi Patterson as Tom's Mom
 Todd Glass as Principal
 Ben Rodgers as Bus Driver
 Erik Griffin as Coach
 Gillian Jacobs as Dakota
 John Malkovich as Mr. B
  Matt Johnson as Announcer
 Taylor Misiak as Yasmine
 Eugene Cordero as Hector

Recurring
 David Duchovny as Ice Cream Man
 Paul Rust as Randy
 Jennifer Coolidge as Dakota's Mom
 Jessica McKenna as Mrs. Band / various
 Mitra Jouhari as Nurse Denise
 Mark Proksch as Dakota's Dad
 Artemis Pebdani as Brenda

Guest
 Elliott Gould as Tom's Grandpa
 Sandy Martin as Tom's Grandma
  Tim Robinson as Plumber
 Thomas Lennon as Neighbor Rick

Episodes

Season 1 (2021)

References

External links 

 Ten Year Old Tom on HBO Max
 

HBO Max original programming
American animated sitcoms
2020s American adult animated television series
2020s American animated comedy television series
2020s American sitcoms
2020 American television series debuts
American adult animated comedy television series
American flash adult animated television series
Animated television series about children
English-language television shows